Kathleen Chandler (born September 19, 1932) is a former Democratic member of the Ohio House of Representatives, who represented the 68th District from 2003–2010.

External links
Profile on the Ohio Ladies Gallery website

Kent State University alumni
Living people
Members of the Ohio House of Representatives
Michigan State University alumni
People from Kent, Ohio
Women state legislators in Ohio
1932 births
21st-century American politicians
21st-century American women politicians